The Greens NSW, also known as the NSW Greens, is a green political party in New South Wales and a member of the Australian Greens. First formed in 1991, the Greens NSW began as a state-level party before joining with other green parties in Australia to create the current federated structure.

The Greens NSW continue to be separate to the other state and territory Greens parties in several regards. The Greens NSW tend to be more left-wing in their political positions in comparison to the other state parties, and continues to maintain the original Greens policy of not having a single parliamentary leader, instead being based on principles of collective leadership.

The party currently sits on the crossbench in the New South Wales Parliament, and has representation federally in the Senate.

History

The first Greens party was registered in 1984, but the Greens NSW did not take its current form until 1991, when six local groups in New South Wales federated as a state political party. Greens candidates have run in every federal election since 1984, when a single candidate ran in the federal Division of Sydney.

The founding document of the Greens NSW described the organisation as the following:

New South Wales state elections

The party first came close to electing a candidate in 1991, when Ian Cohen was the last Upper House candidate to be excluded in a contest against Christian Democratic Party leader Fred Nile for the final statewide seat. In the subsequent 1995 election, Cohen was elected to the NSW Legislative Council and became the first Greens parliamentary representative in NSW. In 1999 he was joined by Lee Rhiannon and in 2003 he was re-elected and joined by Sylvia Hale.
In 2007 Lee Rhiannon was re-elected to the Legislative Council and joined by John Kaye, bringing the number of Members of the Legislative Council to four. In 2010 Lee Rhiannon resigned from the Legislative Council to contest and win a Senate seat, and Sylvia Hale also resigned her seat. The resulting casual vacancies were filled by Cate Faehrmann and David Shoebridge respectively.

At the 2011 NSW state election the Greens further increased their vote, resulting in the election of Jamie Parker as the first Greens member of the Legislative Assembly, representing Balmain. David Shoebridge was re-elected and joined by Jan Barham and Jeremy Buckingham in the Legislative Council.

In 2013 Cate Faehrmann resigned from the Legislative Council to contest a Senate seat. The resulting casual vacancy was filled by Mehreen Faruqi of the South Sydney Greens.

At the 2015 State election current sitting members Jamie Parker, John Kaye and Mehreen Faruqi were re-elected. Two new members were elected to the Legislative Assembly: Jenny Leong in the new seat of Newtown and Tamara Smith in the previously safe National seat of Ballina. The Greens primary vote in Newtown of 45.6% is the party's highest ever primary vote in a lower house electorate. This resulted in five Legislative Council seats and three Legislative Assembly seats.

In October 2016, Jan Barham resigned and the casual vacancy was filled a few months later by former federal candidate for Richmond, Dawn Walker.

In December 2018, Jeremy Buckingham resigned from the Greens NSW.

Buckingham Described the party as "toxic", Buckingham said the Greens had "abandoned the core principles they were founded on" and were more focused on "bringing down capitalism" and "divisive identity politics" than acting on climate change.

At the 2019 state election there were two upper house Greens seats up for contest as was Buckingham's. David Shoebridge was re-elected, Abigail Boyd (former federal candidate for Dobell) won one but Dawn Walker lost hers. Each of the three lower house seats were returned with a favourable swing.

Federal elections

The Greens elected their first ever New South Wales Senator, Kerry Nettle, at the 2001 election, only the second Australian Greens senator elected ever, joining Senator Bob Brown of Tasmania, who was elected to a second term at that election.

In 2002, Michael Organ was elected to the House of Representatives for the Wollongong seat of Cunningham at a by-election. Organ was the first Greens member to be elected to a single-member electorate in Australia.

At the 2004 Federal Election, the Greens ran John Kaye as their lead Senate candidate but was unsuccessful due to unfavourable preference flows and in 2007 Nettle lost her seat despite increasing her vote from 2001. In 2010 the Greens elected Lee Rhiannon to the Senate. No Greens candidates were successful in the 2013 election.

Constitutional Convention

In 1997 The Greens NSW formed part of a joint ticket called Greens, Bill of Rights, Indigenous Peoples for the 1998 Constitutional Convention held in Canberra in February 1998. Catherine Moore led the ticket and was elected for NSW. She joined Christine Milne from Tasmania to focus on ensuring that the overall process was more inclusive.

Local government
The party endorses candidates to stand for election in many of the 128 local government areas across NSW, including in rural and regional areas where the major parties usually do not run candidates on party tickets. The Greens NSW currently have 58 councillors on 32 local councils around NSW.

In NSW local government elections were held in September 2016 and September 2017.

In 2016 The Greens elected three mayors and 24 councillors in the 29 areas where candidates stood. Greens councillors were elected for the first time in: Albury, Broken Hill, Clarence Valley, Glen Innes Severn, Goulburn Mulwaree, Kyogle and Yass Valley. The Greens also grew their vote in Bellingen, Byron, Shoalhaven, Campbelltown, Kiama, Hawkesbury, Wingecarribee, Lismore, Hawkesbury and the Blue Mountains.

In 2017 The Greens elected a further 31 Councillors in Armidale, Bathurst, Canterbury Bankstown, Canada Bay, Hornsby, Inner West, Newcastle, Northern Beaches, Orange, Parramatta, Queanbeyan Palerang, Randwick, Ryde. Snowy Mountains. Waverley, Willoughby, Woollahra, Wollongong.

The Greens have five sitting mayors in Byron, Shoalhaven, Randwick, Bellingen and Tweed.

Structure 

The Greens NSW retain the same basic structure which was created in 1991, with the formation of the statewide party.

State Delegates Council 
The Greens NSW make decisions affecting the state party through the State Delegates Council (SDC), a meeting that consists of a delegate from each local group. The SDC is the highest decision-making body, and controls election campaigns for statewide candidatures (such as the Senate and Legislative Council). It also decides on admitting new local groups as members of the Greens NSW.

Local groups 
The party is made up of 'local groups', who cover a specific geographical area. Local groups have complete responsibility for elections held in their area, particularly elections for the House of Representatives, the New South Wales Legislative Assembly or Local Government. There are currently 56 affiliated local groups in NSW.

Working groups 
A variety of working groups have been established by the SDC, which are directly accessible to all Greens members. Working groups perform an advisory function by developing policy, conducting issues-based campaigns, or performing other tasks assigned by the SDC. These include: 
 Young Greens
 Sex, Sexuality and Gender Identity Working Group
 Women's Working Group
 Refugee Working Group
 Economics Working Group

Political factions 
There is only one publicly acknowledged faction within Greens New South Wales which is the Left Renewal faction. It was formed in late 2016 and presents itself as the far-left, anti-capitalist wing of state's party. As of 2021, Left Renewal is not active within the party.

Electoral Results

NSW Legislative Assembly

NSW Legislative Council

Members of Parliament

Current

Australian Parliament

New South Wales Legislative Council

New South Wales Legislative Assembly

Former

Australian Parliament

New South Wales Legislative Council

See also 
Left Renewal

References

Notes 

New South Wales
Political parties in New South Wales